Denis Aleksandrovich Popov (born 4 February 1979) is an association football manager and a former player who played forward. He played for Russia national football team. In February 2010, he was involved into politics and was running for the Novorossiysk city council.

Honours
 Russian First Division top scorer: 2008 (24 goals).
 Russian Third League Zone 2 top scorer: 1997 (16 goals).

Career statistics

References

External links
  
 Player profile 
 

1979 births
Living people
Russian footballers
Association football forwards
Russia under-21 international footballers
Russia international footballers
Russian Premier League players
Russian expatriate footballers
Expatriate footballers in Belarus
FC Chernomorets Novorossiysk players
FC Slavyansk Slavyansk-na-Kubani players
PFC CSKA Moscow players
FC Kuban Krasnodar players
FC Dinamo Minsk players
PFC Spartak Nalchik players
FC Torpedo Moscow players
FC Khimki players
Russian football managers
FC SKA Rostov-on-Don managers
FC Ufa managers
People from Novorossiysk
Sportspeople from Krasnodar Krai